Johannes Kaltenboeck (Bozen, 29 June 1853 - c. 1919) was an Austrian writer known by his adventure stories. He had three pen names: Max Felde, Fritz Holten and Andries van Straaden.

His life is not very known. He started publishing several novels regularly from 1897 to 1917 in Der Gute Kamerad collections and he was the director of this publication after Wilhelm Speemann. He also wrote patriotic tales during World War I, and his novel about aeroplanes Das Aeromobil was very successful.

Works

As Max Felde 
Der Arrapahu (1900)
Addy, der Rifleman (1900)
Das Astoria-Abenteuer (1901)
Villa Biberheim (1903)
Der Sohn der Wälder (1905)
Abd ur Rahman, der Muzlime (1909)
Denkwürdige Kriegserlebnisse (1915)
Mit vereinten Kräften (1916)
Das Gold vom Sacramento (1917)

As Andries van Straaden 
Der Depeschenreiter (1901)

As Fritz Holten 
Das Polarschiff (1910)
Das Aeromobil (1912)

Bibliography 
 Friedrich Schegk et Heinrich Wimmer, Lexikon der Reise- und Abenteuerliteratur, Meitingen, 1988

1853 births
1919 deaths
Austrian male writers